Anwar (or Anwer, Anwaar, Anouar, Anvar, Enver) is the English transliteration of two Arabic  names commonly used in the Arab world by both Arab Christians and Muslims: the male given name ʼAnwar (أنور), meaning "luminous"  or the female given name ʼAnwār (أنوار), meaning "a collection of lights". In Arabic Anwar is also a comparative adjective with the meaning of "more enlightened".

Both variations may also be encountered as surnames, sometimes also with the accompanying "al" (the definite article "the") as in Al Anwar. 

In Francophone countries, both names are usually transliterated as Anoir, Anouar and Al Anouar with the definite article "al". The name is transliterated in Albania, Bosnia, Kosovo, and Turkey as Enver.

Notable people with the name Anwar and variants include:

People with the given name

Anwar
Anwar (singer) (born 1949), Indian playback singer
 Anwar Ali (banker) (1913–1974), Pakistani economist
Anwar al-Awlaki (1971–2011), Yemeni-American imam, al-Qaeda leader
Anwar El Ghazi (born 1995), Dutch-Moroccan footballer
Anwar Fazal (born 1941), Malaysian environmental activist
Anwar Gargash (born 1959), Emirati politician
Anwar Haddam, Algerian politician
Anwar Hussain (actor) (1928-1988), Indian film actor
Anwar Hussain (cricketer) (1920–2002), Pakistani cricketer
Anwar Ibrahim (born 1947), 10th Prime Minister of Malaysia
Anwar Jibawi, American Internet personality
Anwar Khan (cricketer) (born 1955), Pakistani cricketer
Anwar Maqsood (born 1940), Pakistani television entertainer
Anwar Pervez (born 1935), Pakistan-British businessman
Anwar Sadat (1918–1981), 3rd President of Egypt
Anwar Shaikh (critic of Islam) (1928–2006), Pakistani-British author
Anwar Shaikh (economist) (born 1945), Pakistani-American economist
Anwer Sultan (born 1962), Indian sport shooter
Anwar Siraj (born 1978), Ethiopian football defender
Anwar Tjokroaminoto, Indonesian journalist and politician, former prime minister of Pasundan
Anwar Wagdi (1904-1955), Egyptian actor and director

Anwaar
Anwaar Ahmad (born 1947), Pakistani Urdu writer

Anwer
Anwer Zahidi (born 1946), Pakistani Urdu writer

Anouar
Anouar Abdel-Malek (1924-2012), Egyptian-French political scientist 
Anouar Ayed (born 1978), Tunisian handball player
Anouar Benmalek (born 1956), Algerian novelist, journalist, mathematician and poet
Anouar Ben Naceur (born 1983), Tunisian swimmer 
Anouar Brahem (born 1957), Tunisian oud player and composer
Anouar Diba (born 1983), Dutch footballer of Moroccan descent
Anouar Hadouir (born 1982), Dutch footballer of Moroccan descent
Anouar Kali (born 1991), Dutch footballer of Moroccan descent

People with the surname

Anwar
Anan Anwar, Thai singer
Chairil Anwar, Indonesian poet
Desi Anwar, Indonesian reporter
Faraz Anwar, Pakistani guitarist
Gabrielle Anwar, English actress
Gazi Mazharul Anwar (1943–2022), Bangladeshi film director
Joko Anwar, Indonesian film critic and writer
Joni Anwar, Thai singer
Rosihan Anwar, Indonesian journalist
Saeed Anwar, former Pakistani cricketer
Tariq Anwar (film editor), film editor and father of Gabrielle Anwar
Tariq Anwar (politician), Indian politician

Anwer
Aiman Anwer (born 1991), Pakistani cricketer
Khalid Anwer (born 1938), Pakistani jurist
M. Sawkat Anwer, American bioscientist

Fictional characters with the given name
Anwar Kharral, character in the British drama series Skins
Anwar Ibrahim, character in the science-fiction novel series The Familiar by Mark Z. Danielewski
Anwar, a cat marionette in ITV Meridian children's TV show The Ark
Suvi Anwar, a character in the science-fiction video game Mass Effect: Andromeda
Anwar, character in the British comedy-drama series Sex Education

See also
Ordre du Nichan El-Anouar, a colonial order of merit of the Tajurah sultanate in French Somaliland
Anvar
Enver

References

Arabic-language surnames
Arabic masculine given names